Scincus hemprichii is a species of lizard which is endemic to Yemen.

References

hemprichii
Reptiles described in 1837
Taxa named by Arend Friedrich August Wiegmann